The 2012 Belgian Cup Final, named the Cofidis Cup after the sponsor, was played on 24 March 2012 between Kortrijk and Lokeren. It was the 57th Belgian Cup final and was won by Lokeren.

The match started intensely, with both teams attacking from the start. Kortrijk already had a scoring chance within the first minute, while Lokeren scored an early goal through Hamdi Harbaoui which was correctly disallowed for offside. The major talking point of the match happened after 19 minutes, when a linesman signalled a foul by Lokeren forward and Belgian international Benjamin De Ceulaer, who was subsequently dismissed by referee Jérôme Efong Nzolo with a red card. Nzolo followed the instructions of his assistant and initially showed the red card to a Kortrijk player, when the linesman made clear it should have been De Ceulaer. Both spectators in the stadium and through radio and television broadcast were left unsure about the exact reason as initial replays showed a struggle between Brecht Capon and De Ceulaer, for which a red card seemed very harsh. Although Lokeren played more defensively after the red card, a moderate Kortrijk was not able to create any major chances for the remainder of the first half.

During the second half, Kortrijk did push for the goal and almost scored, with Nebojša Pavlović just missing the cross from Mohamed Messoudi, Ernest Nfor testing the reflexes of Lokeren goalkeeper Copa and Dalibor Veselinović heading a chance wide. In the attacking department of Lokeren, Hamdi Harbaoui was left to handle it on his own, not managing to create any danger. However, with just over an hour played, Lokeren coach brought in Baye Djiby Fall to strengthen the attack and after 77 minutes a play between Fall, Nill De Pauw and Harbaoui set up the latter to lob the ball over Kortrijk goalie Darren Keet. Lokeren was under moderate pressure during the final minutes, but ultimately held on without giving away any major chances. With that, Lokeren had won its first Belgian Cup.

Right after the match, Benjamin De Ceulaer stated that "I'm very happy for our team and president. But for me... the referee took away the most beautiful moment of my career. I will never forgive him. I hope I never meet him again. I refuse to look him in the eye from now on.", but zoomed in replays of the phase indeed showed that De Ceulaer had kicked the legs of Brecht Capon while the ball was nowhere near. Referee Nzolo also stated that he stood behind his decision and although he was forced to follow the judgement of his linesman anyway, he also believed that the linesman made the right judgement and De Ceulaer had been sent off for valid reasons.

Road to the Final

 Both clubs received a bye to round six.
 In square brackets is a letter that represents the opposition's division
 [D1] = Belgian First Division
 [D2] = Belgian Second Division

Match details

See also
2011–12 Belgian Cup

References

Cup
Belgian Cup finals
K.S.C. Lokeren Oost-Vlaanderen matches
May 2012 sports events in Europe
2012 in Brussels
Sports competitions in Brussels